Powerplex STL (stylized as POWERPlex STL), formerly St. Louis Mills and St. Louis Outlet Mall, is a sporting venue and former shopping mall in Hazelwood, Missouri, a suburb of St. Louis, Missouri, United States. Opened in 2003, the mall struggled with tenancy for many years and in 2020, began redevelopment into a sports property.

History
Mills Corporation, a former shopping mall developer, first proposed St. Louis Mills in August 2002. Typical of their properties, St. Louis Mills included a mix of outlet stores, big-box stores, and conventional shopping mall tenants. That year, the company acquired the site off Missouri Route 370 in the city of Hazelwood, Missouri for $20 million.

In July 2012, Simon Property Group, into which Mills Corporation had merged, and it became a bank owned asset thus and was renamed to St. Louis Outlet Mall. As of 2019, there was a sale of the bank asset to new undisclosed owners.  On May 24, 2019, Namdar Realty Group announced the closing of the mall and gave the tenants 30 days to vacate the building. The mall will be redeveloped into a sports complex called POWERplex STL. As of 2021, Cabela’s is still operating independently of the mall.

The mall closed in October 2019.

In November 2022, Big Sports Properties sold 50% of the building to Industrial Commercial Properties

Attractions

Ice Zone
Ice Zone (also styled iceZone) is a 1,200-seat indoor ice arena connected to the Northwest section of the mall. The arena is open to the public for skating, figure skating, and local youth, high school and adult hockey teams. It served as the official practice facility of the St. Louis Blues hockey team until relocating to the newly built Centene Community Ice Center. It offered free bleacher seating for fans during practice sessions.

The Ice Zone is also home to the Gateway Locomotives, a special needs hockey team.

The NASCAR Speedpark
The Speedpark included an indoor/outdoor go-kart race track and sometimes featured appearances by NASCAR drivers such as Kevin Harvick, having them meet with fans and sign autographs. NASCAR Speedpark closed on May 29, 2014.

Skate Park
The ESPN Skate Park opened with the mall in 2003, however, the mall did not have the correct copyright agreement to use the ESPN name with the park which led it to be renamed the "St. Louis Mills Skate Park" in mid-2005. The park then closed in late 2006 and remained closed until 2007 when a new sponsor named Woodward announced that they would take ownership. Plans for that then fell through in late 2007 and the park continued to stay closed until it was re-opened with a new sponsor as "Plan Nine" in  April 2009. The park closed once again in 2017.

References

External links
 Powerplex STL Website

Buildings and structures in St. Louis County, Missouri
Tourist attractions in St. Louis County, Missouri
2003 establishments in Missouri
Sports venues in St. Louis